Gaji (Gaji cloth) is a coarse cloth made primarily of cotton or silk that is used for native Indian dresses.

Structure 
Gaji was similar to khaddar, a rough, coarse material made on handloom by local Julahas (weavers) with cotton or silk. A comparable cloth was garha. The fabric was durable and warm.

Use 
Because of its coarse texture, the fabric was proper in winters for poor. Men and women both were using Gaji; men wore angochha (headwear), dhoti, jacket, and blanket, and women wrapped it as sari and used in chemises.

Production 
The handloom cotton products, including Gaji, were produced in many parts of India; Gaji chiefly was produced in Gujarat, parts of Uttar Pradesh such as Jaunpur, Bareilly and Bengal. Gaji weavers took a significant hit when power looms made their entry.

The Gaji cloth was also one of the products produced in the Jail industry in Mewar.

See also 

 Khadi
 Longcloth

References 

Handloom industry in India
Woven fabrics